There have been two ships in the United States Navy named USS Kimberly, both named after Lewis Ashfield Kimberly:

United States Navy ship names